Raymond Brunson Huey (born 14 September 1944) is a biologist specializing in evolutionary physiology.  He has taught at the University of Washington (UW), and he earned his Ph.D. in biology at Harvard University under E. E. Williams.  He has recently been the chair of the UW Department of Biology, but a retirement celebration was held on 4 Oct. 2013 in Seattle.

Education
After attending Deep Springs College, Huey earned his A.B. with honors in Zoology in 1966 from the University of California, Berkeley.  In 1966, he earned his M.A in  Zoology from the University of Texas at Austin, working with Eric R. Pianka.  He then earned his Ph.D. from Harvard in 1975.

Awards
In 1991, he received the Distinguished Herpetologist Award from the Herpetologists League, and in 1998, he was awarded a Guggenheim Fellowship in Organismic Biology & Ecology.

See also 
 Beneficial acclimation hypothesis
 Comparative physiology
 Ecophysiology
 Evolutionary physiology
 Experimental evolution
 Herpetology
 Phylogenetic comparative methods

References

External links 
  Huey web page
  Huey publications

Further reading 
 Feder, M. E., A. F. Bennett, W. W. Burggren, and R. B. Huey, eds. 1987. New directions in ecological physiology. Cambridge Univ. Press, New York. 364 pp.
 Feder, M. E., A. F. Bennett, and R. B. Huey. 2000. Evolutionary physiology. Annual Review of Ecology and Systematics 31:315-341. PDF
 Garland, T., Jr., and P. A. Carter. 1994. Evolutionary physiology. Annual Review of Physiology 56:579-621. PDF

1944 births
Living people
21st-century American biologists
American physiologists
Evolutionary biologists
Harvard University alumni
Deep Springs College alumni
Fellows of the Ecological Society of America